Moreton Bay Lions Australian Football Sports Club is an Australian rules football club based in Burpengary, Queensland. The team currently competes in AFL Queensland's QFA Division 3 competition.

History
The club was formed in 1986 as the Southern Districts Australian Football Club.

The club commenced in the Sunshine Coast competition and played their first season in 1987. In 1988 the club became incorporated and registered as Caboolture and Southern Districts Australian Football Club Inc. By mid 1990 the council had prepared a playing field on Beerburrum Road adjacent to the Historical Village. Club members and volunteers built a clubhouse and change rooms.

In 1991 the club progressed to the South Queensland Australian Football League and would play against suburban clubs of the greater Brisbane area. The club became Bears and adopted the Brisbane Bears' uniform in 1992. 
The club was very competitive during the 1990s and were runners up several times.  In 1999 the club won its first senior premiership.

In December 2014, it was decided the club's name would be changed from Caboolture to Moreton Bay.

In 2019, under new coach John Soccio, the Moreton Bay Lions won the premiership by 64 points, defeating the Wynnum Vikings. Captain Rhys Nickalls booted 15 goals to take the Best On Ground Award, capping off a brilliant season that included 119 goals in total.

Premierships
1999

2019

2020

2021

References

External links
 Official Facebook page

Queensland State Football League clubs
Sport in the Sunshine Coast, Queensland
1986 establishments in Australia
Australian rules football clubs established in 1986